The 1997 season of the Toppserien, the highest women's football (soccer) league in Norway, began on 26 April 1997 and ended on 11 October 1997.

18 games were played with 3 points given for wins and 1 for draws. Number nine and ten were relegated, while two teams from the First Division were promoted through a playoff round.

Trondheims/Ørn won the league, losing only one game.

League table

Top goalscorers
 24 goals:
  Ragnhild Gulbrandsen, Trondheims-Ørn
 20 goals:
  Ann Kristin Aarønes, Trondheims-Ørn
 19 goals:
  Marianne Pettersen, Asker
 14 goals:
  Line Anzjøn, Verdal
 13 goals:
  Randi Leinan, Kolbotn
 10 goals:
  Dagny Mellgren, Klepp
 9 goals:
  Margunn Haugenes, Bjørnar
  Silvi Jan, Kolbotn
  Monica Enlid, Trondheims-Ørn
 8 goals:
  Nina Reiersen, Athene Moss
  Gro Espeseth, Sandviken
  Brit Sandaune, Trondheims-Ørn

Promotion and relegation
 Bøler and Verdal were relegated to the First Division.
 Fløya and Byåsen were promoted from the First Division through playoff.

References

League table
Fixtures
Goalscorers

Top level Norwegian women's football league seasons
1
Nor
Nor